Route 431, also known as Bonne Bay Road, is a short highway almost entirely within Gros Morne National Park on the island of Newfoundland in the Canadian province of Newfoundland and Labrador. It begins at a junction of Route 430 in Wiltondale and terminates at Trout River. It serves the town of Woody Point on Bonne Bay and passes through the communities of Glenburnie, Birchy Head and Winter House Brook.

Route description

Route 431 begins in Trout River, along the banks of the river of the same name, at a Y-Intersection with Main Street just south of downtown and the coastline. It heads east to enter Gros Morne National Park and pass through The Tablelands section of the park for several kilometres. The highway temporarily exits the park to pass through the town of Woody Point, where it has a Y-Intersection with Back Road (which leads to downtown). Route 431 now winds its way southeast along the coastline of Bonne Bay as it passes through Winter House Brook and Glenburnie-Birchy Head-Shoal Brook. The highway begins winding its eastward through the Long Range Mountains as it re-enters the National Park, where it meets a local road leading to Lomond and crosses the Lomond River. Route 431 now enters Wiltondale and it comes to an end at an intersection with Route 430 (Great Northern Peninsula Highway/Viking Trail).

Major intersections

See also 
List of Newfoundland and Labrador highways

References

431